Taymyr Dolgano-Nenets Autonomous Okrug (Enets: Таймыр Оша-Дюрак район, Nenets: Таймыр Долганы-Ненэцие район), was a federal subject of Russia (an autonomous okrug of Krasnoyarsk Krai), the northernmost in Siberian Russia (and thus North Asia). It was named after the Taymyr Peninsula. It was also called Dolgan-Nenets Autonomous Okrug (Долгано-Ненецкий автономный округ), by the name of the indigenous people, Dolgans and Nenets.

With an area of 862,100 km2 (ranked 4th) and a population of 39,786 (2002 Census), the autonomous okrug was one of the least densely populated areas of Russia as of 2006. Dudinka, with more than half of Taymyr's inhabitants, was the administrative center.

Following a referendum on the issue held on April 17, 2005, Taymyr Dolgano-Nenets and Evenk Autonomous Okrugs were merged into Krasnoyarsk Krai effective January 1, 2007. Taymyr was given a special status within Krasnoyarsk Krai and incorporated as Taymyrsky Dolgano-Nenetsky District.

Administrative divisions

The city of Norilsk, even though it is geographically located within Taymyr Autonomous Okrug, was administratively subordinated directly to Krasnoyarsk Krai prior to the merger.  This also applied to the urban-type settlement of Snezhnogorsk, which was administratively subordinated to Norilsk. Therefore, the okrug's population reported by the Census authorities does not include the populations of Norilsk and Snezhnogorsk.

In popular culture
Although not actually having been filmed in Taymyr, it is depicted in the 1985 film White Nights, starring Mikhail Baryshnikov and Gregory Hines.  During the opening moments of the film, Baryshnikov's character Nikolai Rodchenko - a Soviet defector - is on a passenger plane that crash lands at "Norilsk Air Base."  He later is taken into the home of Hines' character - a US defector - and his wife (played by Isabella Rossellini), where they advise him that he is in Taymyr upon regaining consciousness.

Demographics

Population
(2002):  39,786.

Vital statistics
Source: Russian Federal State Statistics Service

Ethnic groups

Of the 39,786 residents (as of the 2002 census) 1,018 (2.6%) chose not to specify their ethnic background. A quarter of the population identified themselves as indigenous Siberians (Dolgans, Nenets, Nganasans, Evenks, or Enets). 58.6% of the population were ethnic Russians. Other nationalities included 2,423 Ukrainians (6.1%), 587 Volga Germans (1.5%), 425 Volga Tatars (1.1%), 294 Belarusians (0.7%) and 239 Azeris (0.6%)

References

 
Former federal subjects of Russia
Russian-speaking countries and territories